Blessed is the third studio album by Nigerian singer Flavour. It was released on October 18, 2012, by 2nite Entertainment. The album features guest appearances from Wizboyy and Fally Ipupa. Its production was handled by Masterkraft, Wizzboy, Selebobo, MJay, Del B, J Stunt and Dekumzy. The album was supported by the singles "Kwarikwa (Remix)", "Baby Oku", "Shake", "Chinny Baby" and "Ada Ada". Flavour celebrated the album's release at 2nite, a night club he opened in Enugu State. He invited Tiwa Savage, Iyanya, Kcee and Bracket to attend the club's grand opening.

Singles
The Fally Ipupa-assisted track "Kwarikwa" (Remix) was released on July 31, 2012, as the album's lead single. The song's music video was shot and directed in the United States by Godfather Production. Fally Ipupa's scenes were shot in a studio while the rest of the video was shot at residential locations. Masterkraft also made a cameo appearance in the video.

The album's second single "Baby Oku" was released on October 5, 2012. The song's music video was shot and directed in Miami by Antwan Smith. At the beginning of the video, several sky scrapers were shown and the caption "Somewhere off the Coast of Miami" was also shown.

The Del B-produced track "Shake" was released on December 24, 2012, as the album's third single. Its music video was shot in South Africa by Godfather Production. On February 27, 2013, Flavour released "Chinny Baby" as the album's fourth single. The accompanying music video for the song was shot and directed in Cape Town by Trademark Pictures.

The album's fifth single "Ada Ada" was released on June 30, 2013, along with its music video. The song peaked at number 14 on Afribiz's Top 100 Music Chart. Musically, it celebrates traditional weddings across Africa and showcases the beauty of Africa, particularly African women. Nigerian actor John Okafor and reality TV star Nwachukwu Uti made cameo appearances in the video. The music video for "Ada Ada" won Video of the Year, Best High Life Video, Best Indigenous Concept and Best Use of Costumes at the 2013 Nigeria Music Video Awards (NMVA).

Critical reception
Blessed received mixed reviews from music critics. Ogagus Sakpaide of TooXclusive awarded the album 3.5 stars out of 5, acknowledging Flavour for "taking the bulls by the horn and diving deeper into the ocean of highlife". Conversely, Sakpaide said some critics may described the record as "tiresome, beer palour-ish and too eastern". Ayomide Tayo of Nigerian Entertainment Today granted the album 3 stars out of 5, criticizing it for sounding "a tad bit repetitive". Tayo acknowledged Flavour for showing dexterity, but ended the review saying the album has "a slight been here-heard that feeling."

Accolades
Blessed was nominated for Album of the Year and Best R&B/Pop Album at The Headies 2013. It was also nominated for Best Album of the Year at the 2014 Nigeria Entertainment Awards.

Track listing

Release history

References

2012 albums
Albums produced by Masterkraft (producer)
Flavour N'abania albums
Igbo-language albums
Albums produced by Del B
Albums produced by Selebobo